American Girl is the eleventh solo studio album by country pop singer Juice Newton It was released by Renaissance Records in 1999.  Following the release of her 1989 album Ain't Gonna Cry, Newton had concentrated largely on concert performing until the release of The Trouble With Angels in 1998.  However, that album was made up largely of new renditions of songs she had recorded in the past.  Thus American Girl  marked her first recording of original material in twelve years.

Overview
Juice Newton began her recording career in 1975 but did not achieve major stardom until the release of her 1981 album Juice.  The album was a crossover success and yielded three hit singles, "Angel of the Morning", "Queen of Hearts", and "The Sweetest Thing (I've Ever Known)".  The last of these peaked at number one on the Billboard Country Chart. She followed Juice with Quiet Lies (1982), an album that brought her more hits, including "Love's Been a Little Bit Hard on Me" and "Break It to Me Gently", of which the latter earned her the Grammy Award for Best Country Vocal Performance, Female.  Newton's 1985 album Old Flame was her country breakthrough, spawning three number one hits "You Make Me Want to Make You Mine",  "Hurt", and the duet with Eddie Rabbitt "Both to Each Other (Friends & Lovers)" and also three additional Top Ten hits: "Old Flame", "Cheap Love", and "What Can I Do with My Heart". After two more albums (Emotion and Ain't Gonna Cry) Newton concentrated more on concert performing.

Newton's albums Juice, Quiet Lies, Dirty Looks, and Old Flame had all been produced by Richard Landis.  In 1997 Newton reunited with him for The Trouble With Angels, an album made up largely of new renditions of her earlier recordings.
American Girl was released by Renaissance Records on October 12, 1999 and was made up of twelve songs recorded over a period of eight years (May 23, 1991 - July 29, 1999).  In discussing the album and her career Newton stated:
I took quite a risk pulling back my career to concentrate on my family, but I've done some other things, book narration, and learned quite a bit about that.   I've written some stories and with dot.com I may just put those out myself.  Might as well.  We have a great web page. [Doing this album was] quite an adventure. There's quite a variety of music on it.  But I've always been that kind of artist, and there are pluses and minuses to that.  But that's what I do.

Of the album's twelve songs, "Red Blooded American Girl" and the title track were reused from The Trouble With Angels.  The rest were previously unreleased and new recordings. The only single released was "They Never Made It To Memphis". The album featured a big band swing-style number, "Nightime Without You", that Newton wrote.  Among the remaining tracks were cover versions of Nanci Griffith's "Listen to the Radio", Everly Brothers' "Love Hurts", Queen's "Crazy Little Thing Called Love", and Buck Owens' "There Goes My Love". Also included was Tom Petty's "Keepin' Me Alive", which had not been released prior to Newton's version.

In her review of American Girl music critic Charlotte Dillon states:
On this album Juice Newton steps out with some new material for the first time in a number of years. Newton's husky voice puts an original touch to each tune, sure to please both new and old fans. An album worth having.

Track listing

Personnel

Juice Newton – vocals
Eddie Bayers –  drums
Chris Brooks –  drums
Steve Duncan –  drums
Milton Sledge –  drums
Harry Stinson –  drums
Jimmy Nichols –  drums, keyboards, synthesizer
Rick Shlosser –  drums, percussion
Aubry Hayne –  fiddle
Rob Hojacos –  fiddle
Nat Wyner –  fiddle
James Lowry –  acoustic guitar
Jeff King –  acoustic & electric guitar
Steve Cochran –  acoustic & electric guitar, background vocals
Otha Young –  acoustic guitar, background vocals
Dennis Belfield –  bass
Spady Brannan –  bass
David Hungate –  bass
Jay Bodean Cawley –  bass, background vocals
Joe DiBlasi –  electric guitar
John Jorgenson –  electric guitar
Jerry Kimbrough –  electric guitar
Kerry Marx –  electric guitar
Doug Livingston –  steel guitar
Andre Mayeaux –  keyboards, synthesizer
Skip Edwards –  keyboards, synthesizer
Bobby Ogdin –  keyboards, synthesizer
Jay Dee Mannes –  pedal steel
Terry McMillan –  percussion
John McKay, Dina Bennet, Steve McClintock, John Wesley Riles, Lisa Silver, Diane Tidwell, Dennis Wilson, Curtis Young –  background vocals

References

1999 albums
Juice Newton albums
Albums produced by Richard Landis